Mugaiyur is one of the block in Viluppuram District, Tamil Nadu, India.

Etymology
The name Mugaiyur means mugai (bud) + oor (a small settlement or village).

Politics
Mugaiyur assembly constituency had been clubbed into the Tirukoilur constituency.

References

Villages in Viluppuram district
Cities and towns in Tiruvannamalai district